Alpha-taxilin also known as interleukin-14 (IL-14) or high molecular weight B-cell growth factor (HMW-BCGF) is a protein that in humans is encoded by the TXLNA gene.

Interleukin-14 is a cytokine that controls the growth and proliferation of both normal and cancerous B cells. This molecule was also recently designated taxilin. IL-14 induces B-cell proliferation, inhibits antibody secretion, and expands selected B-cell subgroups. This interleukin is produced mainly by T cells and certain malignant B cells.

Gene 

In murine models, two distinct transcripts are produced from opposite strands of the il14 gene that are called IL-14α and IL-14β. The il14 locus is near the gene for LCK on chromosome 1 in humans.

References

External links

Further reading

Interleukins